The Royal Nordic Society of Antiquaries was founded in Denmark on 28 January 1825 by among others Carl Christian Rafn and Rasmus Rask. The company's aim is to promote Norse literature, history and archaeology. The society was first royal on 9 May 1828.

The Society publishes Aarbøger for nordisk Oldkyndighed og Historie

The Society has also published works by Christian Jürgensen Thomsen, Ledetraad Nordic Oldkyndighed (1836), Carl Christian Rafn, Antiquitates Americanae (1837), konung skuggsjá (Kongespeilet) in Danish translation by Finnur Jónsson (1926) and his Lexicon poeticum antiquæ linguæ septentrionalis: Ordbog over det norsk-islandske Skjaldesprog (2nd edition 1931), and the series Nordiske Fortidsminder.

References 

Learned societies of Denmark
Nordic organizations
Scandinavian studies
1825 establishments in Denmark
Organizations established in 1825